Ottavio is the Italian form of Octavius. Its feminine given name version is Ottavia. Ottavio may refer to:

Given name
 Ottavio Cinquanta, the President of the International Skating Union
 Ottavio Leoni, Italian painter
 Ottavio Piccolomini, (1599–1656), Italian nobleman and general
 Ottavio Rinuccini (1562–1621), Italian composer 
 Ottavio Serena (1837–1914), Italian politician and judge

Middle name
 Giuseppe Ottavio Pitoni (1657–1734), Italian composer

Fictional characters
 Don Ottavio, a character in Mozart's opera Don Giovanni
 One of the male innamorati of the commedia

Italian masculine given names